The ETAP 22i is a Belgian trailerable sailboat that was designed by Jacques de Ridder as a cruiser and first built in 1983.

Production
The design was built by ETAP Yachting in Lokeren, Belgium between 1983 and 1996, with 550 boats completed, but it is now out of production.

Design
The ETAP 22i is a recreational keelboat, built predominantly of fibreglass, with wood trim. It has a fractional sloop rig, a raked stem, a plumb transom, a transom-hung rudder controlled by a tiller and a weighted bulb lifting keel. The keel is raised and lowered with a worm gear operated from on deck. It displaces  and carries  of cast iron ballast.

The boat has closed cell foam sandwich compartments that render it unsinkable.

The boat is normally fitted with a small  outboard motor for docking and manoeuvring, mounted in a stern well.

The design has sleeping accommodation for four people, with a double "V"-berth in the bow cabin and two straight settee quarter berths in the main cabin along with a drop-leaf table. The galley is located on both sides, just aft of the bow cabin. The galley is equipped with a two-burner stove and a sink. The head is located under the "V"-berth in the bow cabin.

Operational history
The boat was at one time supported by a class club, the ETAP Owners Association.

In a 2010 review Steve Henkel wrote, "...this boat was popular with high-end small boaters, but there weren't enough of them willing to pay the relatively high price, which included overseas shipping ... This is an elegant and well-thought-out boat we'd consider buying if we were in the market for something in this size range. She has lots going for her. Best features: She has a very good fit and finish; maximum speed and headroom are at the top of her peer group; and her trailer towing weight is within striking distance of 3,000 pounds. She has niceties like a double hull sandwich with closed-cell polyurethane in the middle, which gives added stiffness and makes her virtually unsinkable. (The double skin also keeps the boat
cool in direct sunlight, and warm on cold nights.) Add good-quality hardware including clutches and winches, and an outboard motor well as standard, plus optional "legs" drying out on the hard, and you've got quite a boat. Worst features: Lifting keels are not my favorite configuration. In the 22i's case, all is well as long as the 518-pound cast iron keel slides easily on its nylon guides, and no knocking of the keel against its casing is perceived. If something is heard, the boat may require major fixing."

See also
List of sailing boat types

References

External links
Photo of an ETAP 22i
Video tour of an ETAP 22i

Keelboats
1980s sailboat type designs
Sailing yachts
Trailer sailers
Sailboat type designs by Jacques De Ridder
Sailboat types built by ETAP Yachting